Sunny Cheung Kwan-yang (born 3 March 1996) is a Hong Kong activist and politician. He is the former spokesman for the Hong Kong Higher Institutions International Affairs Delegation (HKIAD) as the representative of the students union council of the University of Hong Kong. He participated in the Umbrella Revolution of 2014 and the 2019–2020 Hong Kong protests. His lobbying efforts in the United States and various countries helped to promote the Hong Kong Human Rights and Democracy Act, along with sanctions on Chinese and Hong Kong officials.

Activism
Cheung was educated at St. Joseph's College. His social activism started in 2012 when he participated in the protests against the Moral and National Education scheme. Cheung also took part in the 2014 Umbrella Revolution, where he joined thousands of protesters to occupy Causeway Bay until it was cleared by the police.

Cheung studied at Hong Kong Baptist University (HKBU), where he served as the vice president of the Hong Kong Baptist University Students' Union (HKBUSU). While he was vice president, the Hong Kong Federation of Students did not reach a consensus and therefore declined to attend the 26th anniversary of the 1989 Tiananmen Square protests for the first time. Cheung had disagreed with "the vigil’s underlying notion that we’re all Chinese". He remarked, "We want to build a democratic Hong Kong. It’s not our responsibility to build a democratic China."

Cheung later on continued his study on Sinology and Politics and Public Administration at the University of Hong Kong. He was an active debater who represented the university as on-stage speaker for political and current affairs motions. As the anti-extradition bill protests emerged in 2019, Cheung actively participated in the demonstrations. On 4 June 2020, he attended the vigil for the 31st anniversary of the Tiananmen Square protests, which was banned by the Hong Kong government. Cheung stated it was his first vigil since the Umbrella Revolution, and the recent circumstances changed his original stance to some extent. Cheung concluded the message by reiterating his support for the ongoing Hong Kong protests.

International lobbying 
On 11 July 2019, twelve student unions came together to form the Hong Kong Higher Institutions International Affairs Delegation (HKIAD), in which Cheung became the spokesperson of the delegation. Cheung described himself as a representative of over 100,000 students across Hong Kong, with the purpose of raising international awareness for the pro-democracy movement.

On 17 September, Cheung testified at the Congressional-Executive Commission on China (CECC) in Washington D.C. with activists Joshua Wong and Denise Ho. In his testimony, Cheung described the background of Hong Kong's protest movement and highlighted the ongoing police brutality by the Hong Kong Police Force. He described the city as "the frontline of the battle for freedom and against authoritarian China." Cheung ended his testimony by stating, "Hong Kong is in a critical moment in its history. We are calling for the U.S. to stand with us in our fight for freedom, democracy and dignity." In the months following Cheung's testimony, the Hong Kong Human Rights and Democracy Act was passed by the United States House of Representatives and the Senate. The bill was signed into law by President Donald Trump on 27 November 2019.

In light of the ongoing protests, Cheung expressed his view that "lobbying international governments is an important way to raise support for protesters in Hong Kong." In September 2019, Cheung met with a number of politicians across Australia, advocating for human rights clauses to be included in free trade agreements. In January 2020, he met with Taiwanese politician Chiu Chui-cheng to discuss forbidding Hong Kong police from entering the country.

After the national security law was introduced in May, Cheung appealed to international governments to offer asylum and residency for the Hong Kong activists. On 30 June, he declared the Hong Kong Higher Institutions International Affairs Delegation had disbanded, ceasing its operations. The looming new law, which targeted Hong Kong activists for "foreign interference", passed on the next day.

Legislative Council bid 
On 18 June 2020, Cheung announced his intention to run in the Hong Kong legislative election for the Kowloon West constituency. In July, he contested in the pro-democracy primaries and emerged as the runner-up behind Jimmy Sham of the League of Social Democrats (LSD). Cheung received 16,992 votes, which represented 20.97% of the electorate, and secured himself a nomination spot in the general election. He was one of the pro-democracy candidates who received letters from electoral officers on his positions on the national security law, before the general election was postponed to 2021.

Exile
In August 2020, Cheung reportedly fled to the United Kingdom out of an imminent arrest warrant against him. The Chinese government warned the British government against hosting Cheung and warned it about offering asylum to other pro-democracy activists. China said the UK was hosting "anti-China" forces after Cheung allegedly planned pro-democracy rallies.

On 15 September 2020, Cheung posted on social media that he had effectively left Hong Kong, though he did not say where he had fled to out of "security and strategic concerns".

On 16 August 2021, Cheung disclosed on his Facebook page that he is seeking asylum in the United States.

References

1996 births
Alumni of Hong Kong Baptist University
Fugitives wanted under the Hong Kong national security law
Hong Kong democracy activists
Hong Kong localists
HKFS people
Living people
Political refugees in the United States